Moon Rappin' is an album by American organist Brother Jack McDuff recorded in 1969 and released on the Blue Note label.

Reception
The Allmusic review by Stephen Thomas Erlewine awarded the album 3 stars and stated "Moon Rappin''' is one of Brother Jack McDuff's most ambitious efforts, a loose concept album that finds the organist exploring funky and spacy soundscapes... It's not strictly funky -- it doesn't have the grit of early Brother Jack records, nor does it swing hard -- but it proves that McDuff was as adept in adventurous territory as he was with the groove".

Track listingAll compositions by Jack McDuff''
 "Flat Backin'" - 10:23 
 "Oblighetto" - 6:36 
 "Moon Rappin'" - 6:21 
 "Made in Sweden" - 7:37 
 "Loose Foot" - 5:03
Recorded at Soundview Recording Studio in Kings Park, New York on December 1 (track 1), December 2 (track 2), December 3 (track 3) and December 11 (tracks 4 & 5), 1969.

Personnel
Brother Jack McDuff - organ 
Unknown - trumpet
Bill Phillips - tenor saxophone, flute
Unknown - baritone saxophone, tenor saxophone 
Jerry Byrd - guitar
Richard Davis - electric bass
Joe Dukes - drums

References

1969 albums
Blue Note Records albums
Jack McDuff albums
Jazz-funk albums